District 1 of the Oregon State Senate comprises all of Curry County, as well as southern Coos County, southern Douglas County, western Josephine County, and the northwesternmost part of Jackson County. It is currently held by Republican Dallas Heard of Roseburg.

Election results
District boundaries have changed over time, therefore, senators before 2013 may not represent the same constituency as today. From 1993 until 2003, the district covered part of Northwest Oregon, and from 2003 until 2013 it covered a slightly different area in southwestern Oregon.

References

01
Coos County, Oregon
Curry County, Oregon
Douglas County, Oregon
Jackson County, Oregon
Josephine County, Oregon